USCGC Boutwell (WHEC-719) was a United States Coast Guard high endurance cutter based out of San Diego, California. Named for George S. Boutwell, United States Secretary of the Treasury under President Ulysses S. Grant. Boutwell engaged in many Coast Guard missions, including search and rescue, law enforcement, maritime security, and national defense.

Boutwell was decommissioned on March 16, 2016 at Naval Base San Diego, California.

History 

She was built in 1967 in the Avondale Shipyards in New Orleans, Louisiana. She was launched on 17 June 1967, and her launching sponsor was Mrs. Douglas Dillon. After she was commissioned in 1968, she proceeded to her first home port, Boston, Massachusetts. In 1973 she moved to Seattle, Washington, where she remained until she entered the Fleet Renovation and Modernization Program in 1990. Once her renovation was complete she moved to Coast Guard Island in Alameda, California. In 2011 she relocated to San Diego, California, to replace the decommissioned high endurance cutter .

In 1980 Boutwell conducted the largest at-sea rescue ever achieved, when she rescued more than 500 people from the burning cruise ship  in the Gulf of Alaska. In 1998, Boutwell made the largest high-seas drift net arrest in Coast Guard history.

Boutwell participated in the 2003 invasion of Iraq. She defended the oil terminals off the coasts of Iraq and Iran. For her many accomplishments and continued excellence, Boutwell received the Admiral John B. Hayes Award for Unit Excellence.  In 2005, she seized  of cocaine over US$900 million using the newly developed Go-Fast Response Team. With the help of a helicopter from the new Helicopter Interdiction Tactical Squadron (HITRON), Boutwell demonstrated a capability to stop and seize drugs from every go-fast boat she pursued.

Boutwell was recognized as the 2013 Forrest O. Rednour Memorial Award Large Afloat Dining Facility and as the second-place winner for the 2014 Large Unit Afloat MWR [Morale, Welfare, and Recreation] Program of the Year. In October 2014, Boutwell completed a noteworthy counterdrug deployment in support of the U.S. Coast Guard's Western Hemisphere Strategy; this deployment was cited by Commandant of the Coast Guard Admiral Paul Zukunft as an example of how better integration of operations and intelligence can have an impact on smuggling in the Western Hemisphere.

After U.S. President Barack Obama announced during the Asia-Pacific Economic Cooperation (APEC) Economic Leaders' Meeting in November 2015 that concluded the 2015 APEC summit in Manila that the United States would make a U.S. Coast Guard high endurance cutter and the Scripps Institution of Oceanography research vessel  available to the Philippines, Boutwell was decommissioned on 16 March 2016 at Naval Base San Diego, California, and sold to the Philippines as an excess defense article (EDA). Boutwell was the third  to be transferred to the Philippine Navy.

References

External links

 Boutwell home page

Hamilton-class cutters
Ships of the United States Coast Guard
Ships built in Bridge City, Louisiana
1967 ships